Petra Huber (born 15 February 1966) is a former professional tennis player from Austria.

Biography

Junior career
Before turning professional, Huber competed with success on the junior circuit. In 1982 she partnered with Judith Polz to make the girls' doubles semi-finals at the Australian Open and quarter-finals at the French Open. She was a semi-finalist in the girls' singles event at the 1983 French Open.

Professional tennis
Huber made her first WTA Tour final at the 1984 Miami Classic, which she lost to Laura Arraya. She reached the round of 16 at the 1984 US Open to obtain her highest career ranking of 37 in the world.

In 1986 she won the Spanish Open as an unseeded player. She had a semi-final win over a young Arantxa Sánchez Vicario, who was appearing in her first WTA main draw, then beat Italian Laura Garrone in the final. In doubles she was a finalist at three WTA events in 1986, for one win, partnering Petra Keppeler in Bregenz.

Representative
At the 1984 Summer Olympics, Huber was Austria's representative in the women's singles demonstration event.

She featured in a total of 12 Fed Cup ties for Austria. This includes Austria's 1986 Fed Cup campaign, in which they made the final eight of the World Group. In the quarter-final she lost a close three set match to Argentina's top player Gabriela Sabatini.

WTA Tour finals

Singles (1-1)

Doubles (2-2)

References

External links
 
 
 

1966 births
Living people
Austrian female tennis players
Tennis players at the 1984 Summer Olympics